The 1967 NAIA World Series was the 11th annual tournament hosted by the National Association of Intercollegiate Athletics to determine the national champion of baseball among its member colleges and universities in the United States and Canada.

The tournament was played at Phil Welch Stadium in St. Joseph, Missouri.

New Mexico Highlands defeated Glassboro State in the championship series, 6–1, to win the Cowboys' first NAIA World Series.

Glassboro State player Ken Lange was named tournament MVP.

Bracket

See also
 1967 NCAA University Division baseball tournament

Reference

NAIA World Series
NAIA World Series
NAIA World Series